Burnt to Bitz: At the Astoria is a live album by Graham Coxon. The two-disc album is a complete recording of Coxon's gig at the London Astoria on the 25 October 2006.

Track listing
All tracks composed by Graham Coxon; except where indicated

Disc one
 "Escape Song" - 3:00 
 "Spectacular" - 2:53
 "I Can't Look at Your Skin" - 3:24
 "No Good Time" - 3:26
 "I Wish" - 5:44
 "Bittersweet Bundle of Misery" - 5:20
 "What's He Got?" - 4:33
 "Girl Done Gone" - 5:04
 "All Over Me" - 4:48
 "Just a State of Mind" - 5:11
 "You & I" - 4:06
 "Standing on My Own Again" - 4:30
 "Right to Pop!" - 2:50
 "Don't Let Your Man Know" - 3:30
 "What Ya Gonna Do Now?" - 3:01
 "Bloody Annoying" - 3:20

Disc two
 "Freakin' Out" - 3:46
 "That's When I Reach for My Revolver" (Clint Conley) - 4:27
 "People of the Earth" - 3:50
 "Big Bird" - 7:26
 "See A Better Day" - 5:37
 "All Mod Cons" (Paul Weller) - 1:12
 "You Always Let Me Down" - 2:52
 "I Don't Wanna Go Out" Pt. 1 - 3:20
 "I Don't Wanna Go Out" Pt. 2 - 1:31
 "Gimme Some Love" - 2:52
 "Who the Fuck?" - 5:07
 "Life It Sucks" - 4:04

The band
Graham Coxon - guitar, vocals
Stephen Gilchrist - drums, backing vocals
Toby MacFarlaine - bass guitar, backing vocals
Owen Thomas - guitar
with:
Sean Read - keyboards, maracas

References

External links
Official Graham Coxon site
Download site

Graham Coxon albums
2006 live albums